Franciszek Krótki (born 28 February 1955) is a Polish football manager.

References

1949 births
Living people
Polish football managers
Odra Wodzisław Śląski managers
Odra Opole managers
Zagłębie Sosnowiec managers
People from Wodzisław County